Balıkköy (also: Balık, Laz language: Zendidi) is a village in the Hopa District, Artvin Province, Turkey. Its population is 200 (2021).

References

Villages in Hopa District